The Coca-Cola Charity Championship was a golf tournament on the Sunshine Tour. It was founded in 2006 as a finale to the tour's "Winter Swing", and was last played over the Gary Player-designed Outeniqua course at the Fancourt Hotel and Country Club, near George, Western Cape, South Africa.

Winners

References

External links
Sunshine Tour - official site

Former Sunshine Tour events
Golf tournaments in South Africa